Miguel Lerdo de Tejada (September 29, 1869 in Morelia – May 25, 1941) was a Mexican composer/songwriter, pianist, and conductor.

Lerdo de Tejada studied in Morelia and Mexico City. One of his most popular pieces was a song Perjura,  with text by Fernando Luna y Drusina. His zarzuelas were also very popular in Mexico. He took his Orchesta Típica Lerdo (Carlo Curti's Mexican Typical Orchestra remade) and toured the United States; one of his performances was at the Pan-American Exposition in Buffalo, New York. He continued to tour with his own ensemble in the U.S., Cuba, and South America until his death.

His compositions are classed as "Light classical." He has been described as the first "popular composer" in Mexico. His works included many arrangements of traditional songs in addition to original works.

Selected works
Las luces de los ángeles, zarzuela
Las dormilonas, zarzuela
Esther, song (1895)
Perjura, song (1901)
Consentida, song (1901)
Amparo, dedicated to Ramón Corral (1921)
Paloma blanca, song (1921)
Las golondrinas, song
El faisan, waltz
Tlálpam, intermezzo-two step, dedicated to the borough of Tlalpan, D.F. (1911)

Web sources

External links
 Miguel Lerdo de Tejada recordings at the Discography of American Historical Recordings.

1869 births
1941 deaths
Mexican classical composers
Mexican Romantic composers
Mexican conductors (music)
Male conductors (music)
People from Morelia
Musicians from Michoacán
Mexican male classical composers
20th-century conductors (music)
20th-century male musicians
19th-century male musicians